Mills is an unincorporated community in Potter County, Pennsylvania, United States. Mills has a post office with ZIP code 16937.

References

Unincorporated communities in Potter County, Pennsylvania
Unincorporated communities in Pennsylvania